Åland is an archipelago at the entrance to the Gulf of Bothnia in the Baltic Sea belonging to Finland. Åland's economy is heavily dominated by shipping, trade and tourism. Shipping represents about 40% of the economy, with several international carriers owned and operated off Åland. Most companies aside from shipping are small, with fewer than ten employees. Farming and fishing are important in combination with the food industry. According to Eurostat, in 2006 Åland was the 20th wealthiest of the EU's 268 regions, and the wealthiest in Finland, with a GDP per inhabitant 47% above the EU mean. In 2015 it had the 34th highest regional gross domestic product (PPS of 39 700 EUR per inhabitant) of the 340 NUTS 2 regions, the second within the country after Helsinki-Uusimaa (42 400 EUR).

Notable firms 
This list includes notable companies with primary headquarters located in the country. The industry and sector follow the Industry Classification Benchmark taxonomy. Organizations which have ceased operations are included and noted as defunct.

References 

companies
Aland